Jane Stork, or Ma Shanti B, is a former follower of Rajneesh. She wrote Breaking the Spell: My Life as a Rajneeshee and the Long Journey Back to Freedom (2009) about her experience, and is featured in Wild Wild Country, a Netflix documentary series about the controversial Indian guru.

Jane Stork had a husband and two children.

References

Year of birth missing (living people)
Living people
Australian women writers
Australian writers
Rajneesh movement